Minacraga indiscata is a moth in the family Dalceridae. It was described by Harrison Gray Dyar Jr. in 1910. It is found in French Guiana, north-western Brazil and Peru. The habitat consists of tropical moist forests.

References

Moths described in 1910
Dalceridae